The Church of Our Lady of Laeken is a neo-Gothic Roman Catholic church in the Brussels district of Laeken, Belgium. It was originally built in memory of Queen Louise-Marie, wife of King Leopold I, to the design of the architect Joseph Poelaert.

The Royal Crypt underneath the shrine is the main resting place for the members of the Belgian Royal Family, with some notable artisans also interred at the nearby cemetery. The venerated Marian image enshrined within was crowned in 1936 by pontifical decree.

History

Inception and construction
Queen Louise-Marie, wife of King Leopold I, died in Ostend in 1850 and wished to be buried in Laeken. The nearby Royal Palace of Laeken was, and still is, the royal residence. Leopold I wished the church to be constructed in her memory and as a mausoleum for her. By royal decree of 14 October 1850, the Belgian Government authorised the construction of the edifice and organised a competition, the rules of which stipulated that the church should be able to contain 2,000 people and that its price should not exceed 800,000 Belgian francs.

The architect Joseph Poelaert was chosen to design the new church. He later became best known for the Law Courts of Brussels. The project initially selected was a fairly simple brick building with stone bands and whose facade was surmounted by a single spire covered with slate. In 1853, the jury proposed to modify the project in the direction of greater monumentality, with a neo-Gothic facade with three spires. This led to an overrun of the initial budget, which was the first of a long series.

The first stone was laid by Leopold I in 1854. In 1865, Poelaert, absorbed by the Law Courts project since 1862, claimed health problems and gave up the management of the works. Several architects succeeded him: Auguste Payen, Antoine Trappeniers, Louis de Curte and Alphonse Groothaert.

The church is monumental, and although consecrated in 1872, apart from maintenance and consolidation works, its completion was resumed only after a lengthy interruption. It was King Leopold II who, concerned about the embellishment of the place, in 1896, relaunched the project still compromised by the lack of funds. In 1902, as the building continued to deteriorate, a Munich architect, Baron Heinrich von Schmidt, was commissioned to carry out a general examination of its condition. In 1907, the Government approved his plan to complete the main facade, the monumental porches and the central tower. This work was carried out from 1909 to 1911.

20th and 21st centuries
Pope Pius XI crowned the image of the Blessed Virgin Mary enshrined within the church on 17 May 1936 in the presence of the King Leopold III and his royal heirs. This venerated Marian image became the source for the image of Our Lady of China, crowned by Pope Francis on 19 February 2021.

In 2003, a restoration project began on the front facade and the three towers (2003–2006), the roofs (2007–2009) and the side facades (2010–2012).

Royal Crypt

The Royal Crypt underneath the church holds the tombs of the Belgian Royal Family, including those of all the former Kings of the Belgians. These tombs include:
 Leopold I of Belgium
 Louise of Orléans
 Prince Baudouin of Belgium
 Prince Leopold, Duke of Brabant 
 Marie Henriette of Austria
 Leopold II of Belgium
 Princess Marie of Hohenzollern-Sigmaringen
 Charlotte of Belgium, later known as Carlota of Mexico, empress consort of Emperor Maximilian I of Mexico
 Albert I of Belgium 
 Astrid of Sweden
 Elisabeth of Bavaria 
 Prince Charles, Count of Flanders
 Leopold III of Belgium
 Baudouin of Belgium
 Lilian, Princess of Réthy
 Prince Alexandre of Belgium
 Fabiola de Mora y Aragon

The adjacent Laeken Cemetery behind the church is known as the Belgian Père Lachaise because it is the burial place of the major Catholic nobility, important families and some famous artists.

Gallery

See also

 List of churches in Brussels
 Roman Catholicism in Belgium
 History of Brussels
 Belgium in "the long nineteenth century"

References

Notes

Bibliography

External links

 

Roman Catholic churches in Belgium
Roman Catholic churches in Brussels
City of Brussels
Gothic Revival church buildings in Belgium
Burials sites of House of Saxe-Coburg and Gotha (Belgium)